Hear Me. Love Me. is an Amazon prime video series. It premiered on Amazon Video on 28 September 2018. Hosted by actress Shilpa Shetty, where she plays the Cupid and mentors to these young participants.

Plot
The show follows a girl going on 3 dates with 3 men. The girl spends time with the men but is unable to see them as they have a camera strapped around the chest. The show has women aged 21–30 who go on virtual dates to find their suitor. At the end of the day, the girl has to pick the person she likes on the basis of their personality and then the 3 men's faces are revealed. The chosen person and the girl then have a choice of going ahead with a date. Shilpa Shetty will be seen helping the girl navigate her emotions while tapping into her personal anecdotes and experience.

Cast 
Shilpa Shetty as Show Host

References

External links

 Hear Me Love Me - Official Trailer on Amazon Prime Video

Amazon Prime Video original programming
Hindi-language television shows
2018 Indian television series debuts
Television shows set in Mumbai
Dating and relationship reality television series
Indian reality television series